A subset  of a topological space  has the property of Baire (Baire property, named after René-Louis Baire), or is called an almost open set, if it differs from an open set by a meager set;  that is, if there is an open set  such that  is meager (where  denotes the symmetric difference).

Definitions 

A subset  of a topological space  is called almost open and is said to have the property of Baire or the Baire property if there is an open set  such that  is a meager subset, where  denotes the symmetric difference.

Properties 

The family of sets with the property of Baire forms a σ-algebra. That is, the complement of an almost open set is almost open, and any countable union or intersection of almost open sets is again almost open.  Since every open set is almost open (the empty set is meager), it follows that every Borel set is almost open.

If a subset of a Polish space has the property of Baire, then its corresponding Banach–Mazur game is determined.  The converse does not hold; however, if every game in a given adequate pointclass  is determined, then every set in  has the property of Baire. Therefore, it follows from projective determinacy, which in turn follows from sufficient large cardinals, that every projective set (in a Polish space) has the property of Baire.

It follows from the axiom of choice that there are sets of reals without the property of Baire.  In particular, the Vitali set does not have the property of Baire.  Already weaker versions of choice are sufficient: the Boolean prime ideal theorem implies that there is a nonprincipal ultrafilter on the set of natural numbers; each such ultrafilter induces, via binary representations of reals, a set of reals without the Baire property.

See also

References

External links 

 Springer Encyclopaedia of Mathematics article on Baire property

Descriptive set theory
Determinacy